Gugi (also Romanized as Gūgī; also known as Gooki) is a village in Khafrak-e Olya Rural District, Seyyedan District, Marvdasht County, Fars Province, Iran. At the 2006 census, its population was 153, in 38 families.

References 

Populated places in Marvdasht County